Cassa di Risparmio di Orvieto S.p.A. is an Italian bank based in Orvieto, in the Province of Terni, Umbria.

History
Cassa di Risparmio di Orvieto was found in 1863, just two years after the unification of Italy. In December 1991 the statutory corporation was split into a limited company and Ente Cassa di Risparmio di Orvieto. The limited company was acquired by Banca CR Firenze in late 1990s and then Banca Popolare di Bari in 2009. Between the two owners, Intesa Sanpaolo also owned the bank from 2007 to 2009 via Banca CR Firenze.

See also
 Banca dell'Umbria
 Casse di Risparmio dell'Umbria

References

External links
  

Banks established in 1863
1863 establishments in Italy
Banks of Italy
Companies based in Umbria
Orvieto
Intesa Sanpaolo acquisitions
Former Intesa Sanpaolo subsidiaries